Zeugophiurina is a suborder of primitive brittle stars with three extinct families. The family Ophiocanopidae with only one living genus and species, Ophiocanops fugiens has been placed here but recent studies have challenged this classification.

References

Oegophiurida
Animal suborders